Israel Tsvaygenbaum (born February 1, 1961), is a Russian-American artist of Jewish descent. A number of his works are in the Museum of Imitative Arts, Derbent.

Biography

Tsvaygenbaum was born in the Southern Russian city of Derbent, one of the oldest cities in the world. The population is predominantly Muslim, but there are also Jewish families residing there.  Tsvaygenbaum's parents are Jewish. His father, from Bedzin, Poland, escaped to the Soviet Union during World War II. Tsvaygenbaum's mother was a Mountain Jew from Dagestan, Russia.

The culture and dynamic of the life of the area where Tsvaygenbaum grew up and his Jewish background are reflected in his paintings. The Russian newspaper Derbentskie izvestiya once wrote about Tsvaygenbaum's work:

Another paragraph in the newspaper says:

From 1976 to 1980 Tsvaygenbaum studied art at Izberbash College, Izberbash, Dagestan. In 1991, he completed his masters in Fine Arts at Kuban State University, Krasnodar. Tsvaygenbaum organized Coloring, an association of artists, in Derbent in 1986. Coloring had art shows in Derbent and in the Art Gallery in Makhachkala, Dagestan, Russia.

From 1983 to 1985 Tsvaygenbaum pursued his love for acting by playing at amateur Judeo-Tat theatre in his hometown of Derbent. During these times, he painted portraits of two actors, Bikel Matatova (1928-2013) and Roman Izyaev (1940-2018).

In November 1993 and April 1994 Tsvaygenbaum had his last two shows in Russia. Both shows were two solo exhibitions held in Moscow, the first at East Gallery and the second, JEWISH RHAPSODY, at The Central House of Artist on Krymsky Val. The artist dedicated JEWISH RHAPSODY to his father.

In July 1994, Tsvaygenbaum and his family left Russia because it had become very dangerous for his family to continue to live in the republic of Dagestan. Currently, he is a resident of Albany, New York. In the USA Tsvaygenbaum has continued to work with oil on canvas. His paintings continue to portray both universal and Jewish themes, but noticeably, his palette has shifted from browns to yellows.

On December 25, 2016 in Europe and in Israel and on January 15, 2017 in the USA, RTVi broadcast an interview with Tsvaygenbaum in the program "In New York with Victor Topaller," where the artist talked about his artwork, life and interesting people that he encountered in his life.

In 2016 Tsvaygenbaum was a guest author of the book "There was such a city. Derbent." The book was published in Russian. He included short stories from his childhood days in his hometown Derbent.

In 2018 Tsvaygenbaum was the guest author of another book "Proud, Happy, and Thankful to be Jewish." It was published in USA in English. His short stories in the book were labeled "Memoir: The Judaism in My Life."

In 2023 Tsvaygenbaum published in USA in English his memoir "My Secret Memory." The artist's memoir is based on his memories and experiences that inspired some of his works of art. It gives the reader a window into the artist's life and the lives of those who were important to Tsvaygenbaum and impactful in his life. The book features 35 images of the artist's paintings.

Cooperation with other artist

In 2001, in Albany, NY, Tsvaygenbaum began collaborating with dancer Judy Trupin. Trupin created dance compositions based on nine of Tsvaygenbaum's paintings. These were the foundation for the show Worlds in Our Eyes. In 2002, the newspaper The Record wrote:

The newspaper Daily Gazette wrote:
	

	
Worlds in Our Eyes had been performed in several cities of New York State.

Awards

2013. Media 3. Art Biennial. Diploma of Excellence. Art Addiction Medial Museum. London.

Gallery

References

External links

 

1961 births
Living people
People from Derbent
Russian Jews
Mountain Jews
Russian emigrants to the United States
American people of Polish-Jewish descent
American people of Russian-Jewish descent
American people of Mountain Jewish descent
20th-century American painters
American male painters
21st-century American painters
American art
Painters from New York (state)
Jewish painters
Artists from Albany, New York
Modern painters
20th-century Russian painters
Russian male painters
21st-century Russian painters
Soviet artists
Kuban State University alumni
Jewish American artists
21st-century American Jews
20th-century American male artists
20th-century Russian male artists
21st-century Russian male artists
Autobiographies